Colin Ratushniak (born 18 August 1985) is a Canadian professional ice skater and politician who appeared in the TV show Dancing on Ice in 2011, with celebrity skating partner Laura Hamilton. In September 2012, Ratushniak attained a two-year visa and moved to the UK to concentrate on building a career in TV production. In November 2020, he was elected the mayor of the town of La Ronge, Saskatchewan.

Background
Born in Gillam, Manitoba in Canada, Ratushniak began skating at the age of two. He played ice hockey until he was 12 years old, at which point he began making the transition from hockey player to ice skater. When his family moved to Brandon, he continued training and began his competitive career.

Competitive career
From 1998 to 2002, Ratushniak reigned as the province of Manitoba's men's novice champion. He also won a pre-novice bronze medal at the Junior National Championships in 2000.

Professional skating career

2003–2010
In 2003, after graduating from high school, Ratushniak turned professional and joined Feld Entertainment to skate in the critically acclaimed Disney on Ice productions, touring the UK in 2008 with the show "High School Musical." For the next 8 years he continued to tour, working with illustrious names such as Rand Productions and Karen Kresge Productions, to date performing in over 50 countries and 500 major cities across 5 continents. During this time he also developed his skills as a pairs skater, pairing up with Amanda Frank and Isabelle Gauthier. In 2010, at age 24, Ratushniak performed his first backflip on the ice.

2011

Dancing on Ice
In January 2011, Ratushniak took his first foray into the world of prime time TV when he appeared as a professional skater in series 6 of the UK TV show Dancing on Ice with celebrity partner, Laura Hamilton and the couple were early favourites to win the series. They eventually finished runners up in the series to Brianne Delcourt and Sam Attwater and went on to perform in cities across the UK with the Dancing on Ice Live Tour.

Performances/results

Beyond Broadway
In August and September 2011, Ratushniak performed alongside Olympic figure skating champion Joannie Rochette in the show Beyond Broadway at the Canadian National Exhibition (CNE). Performing with professional partner Isabelle Gauthier, they skated to the song "Seasons of Love" from the Broadway musical Rent, as well as joining the rest of cast for other routines.

Tropicana – The Passion Tour
The end of 2011 and the beginning of 2012 saw Ratushniak performing in the Holiday on Ice show, Tropicana. Running from December 2011 until February 2012 across The Netherlands and the UK, the show was created and choreographed by Olympic champion Robin Cousins MBE and featured music from singer Barry Manilow. The show premiered in Eindhoven and went on to play in Amsterdam, Maastricht, Utrecht, Zwolle, Brighton, Peterborough, Cardiff and Exeter.

2012

Skating on Broadway
In March 2012, Ratushniak travelled to Irapuato in Mexico to perform in the Ucha Atayde Entertainment production of Skating on Broadway. The show's cast performed to a selection of songs from Broadway musicals with Ratushniak taking the starring role in the sections for Rent and Lion King. He returned to Mexico in April 2012 and again in June 2012 this time performing the show in the cities of Villahermosa and Durango respectively. During the latter period he took on the additional role of Company Manager, responsible for co-ordinating all aspects of the show's production.

Quebec club shows
In between his shows in Mexico, Ratushniak joined forces with pro partner Isabelle Gauthier once again to perform as guests in the Annual Gala shows of skating clubs in Quebec. As well as their Seasons of Love routine from the show Beyond Broadway, Ratushniak and Gauthier performed a new routine that they'd choreographed especially for the shows, skating to the song "Moves Like Jagger". The shows took place at skating clubs in Charny, Abénakis and Lac-Mégantic.

Rock on Ice
In April 2012 and again in June 2012 Ratushniak performed in the production of Rock on Ice, a show which ran alongside the production Skating on Broadway. He joined the cast for the show's run in the cities of Villahermosa and Durango in Mexico performing as both a soloist and member of the ensemble to songs from rock legends including ZZ Top, Van Halen, Pink Floyd and Queen. His role as Company Manager whilst in Durango encompassed both shows.

Kyran Bracken's Ice Party
After moving to the UK permanently in September 2012, Ratushniak performed for the first time with professional skater, Patti Petrus, at Kyran's Bracken's Ice Party in Blackpool. The show took place from 1 to 3 November with Ratushniak and Petrus skating pairs routines alongside other professional skaters Karen Barber, Daniel Whiston and Brianne Delcourt.

Stars on Ice Australia
In November 2012 Ratushniak travelled to Singapore to perform in the Stars on Ice Australia Christmas Gala shows which took place in Novena Square. He performed in the show as a soloist as well as pairs. The show ran from 24 November until 23 December.

2013

Celebrities on Ice
Performing alongside TV personality Chico Slimani, England Rugby legend Kyran Bracken, West End star Ray Quinn and the world-famous Russian Ice Stars, Ratushniak starred in the show Celebrities on Ice in January 2013. Held at Peterborough Arena from 25 to 27 January, the show was hosted by celebrity Christopher Biggins. The show subsequently embarked on a UK nationwide arena tour from April until June 2013 where he performed alongside Dancing on Ice celebrities Beth Tweddle, Matthew Lapinskas and Gareth Thomas and professional skaters Daniel Whiston, Brianne Delcourt and Jenna Nicole Smith.

Stars on Ice Australia
Ratushniak ended the year with a return to Singapore to perform once again at the Velocity Christmas shows held in Novena Square. The show, produced by Stars on Ice Australia, ran from 26 November to 22 December and featured a mix of popular music and classic Christmas songs performed by a cast of three professional skaters.

2014

Skate in the City
Taking place at Broadgate Ice Rink and hosted by Southend Airport, Ratushniak performed alongside English rugby player and Dancing on Ice star Kyran Bracken, 
X factor contestant Chico, Eastenders and Dancing on Ice contestant Matt Lapinskas, and the Russian Ice Stars in a one-off outdoor event, Skate in the City.

Val-Bélair Gala Show
Ratushniak was reunited with pro skating partner Isabelle Gauthier on 5 April to perform at the Val-Bélair Gala Show in Quebec. The pair skated their Seasons of Love and Moves Like Jagger routines at the show; the first they had paired up for since March 2013.

Filmography

TV production

Other interests
As well as being a professional ice skater, Ratushniak is also a qualified pilot and licensed property developer.

Ratushniak was elected mayor of the northern town of La Ronge, Saskatchewan in November 2020, making him the first openly gay mayor in La Ronge's history. He resigned his position in July 2022 to pursue a career as a commercial pilot.

References

External links
Riverlight Talent Inc
Colin Ratushniak backflip

1985 births
Gay politicians
Gay sportsmen
LGBT figure skaters
LGBT mayors of places in Canada
Living people
Canadian male single skaters
Sportspeople from Manitoba
Canadian LGBT sportspeople
Mayors of places in Saskatchewan
21st-century Canadian LGBT people
Canadian gay men
21st-century Canadian politicians